Estakáda Považská Bystrica (working name: Most 206) is an  extradosed bridge leading across the narrowest part of Považská Bystrica in Slovakia.

References 
 Bridge by the words of the designer 
 Information about the bridge 

Cable-stayed bridges in Slovakia